Akra Kaur Dam, sometimes also referred to as Ankara Kaur Dam, is located near Gawadar in Balochistan, Pakistan. The dam was constructed in 1995  at a cost of $24 million  to supply water to Gawadar and adjoining villages. It is the sole source of water supply to residents of the Gwadar District area.

In 2005, torrential rain in the area caused an overflow from the dam, inundating a number of villages and claiming at least 20 lives. In July 2012, reports emerged that the dam had dried up completely due to large-scale siltation. This has posed serious water supply challenges to local residents, including acute shortage of drinking water.

See also
 List of dams and reservoirs in Pakistan

References

Dams in Pakistan
Gwadar District
Dams completed in 1995
1995 establishments in Pakistan
Dams in Balochistan, Pakistan